New Zealand has competed at every World Games since the first edition in 1981. New Zealand have won 37 medals and are currently 32nd on the all-time World Games medal table. Their most recent participation was in the in the 2022 World Games.

By year

References

 
Nations at the World Games